Milo is a community located in Carter County, Oklahoma, United States. It is on State Highway 53, south of the Arbuckles. The post office opened October 28, 1899. It was later closed. The current ZIP Code is 73458 assigned to Springer. Milo is said to have been a portmanteau of the initials of the four daughters of resident J.W. Johnson.

References

Unincorporated communities in Carter County, Oklahoma
Unincorporated communities in Oklahoma